Pedro Montañez (April 24, 1914 – June 26, 1996) was a boxer from Cayey, Puerto Rico.  Also known as El Torito De Cayey (The Little Bull of Cayey), he has been considered by many to be one of the best boxers in history never to win a world title.  In his career, he was 91–8–4 (51KO).

Career
Montañez was recognized by Ring Magazine as one of history's most prolific knockout winners with 56 knockout wins, and one of the Latinos with the most knockout wins—while only being knocked out twice himself.  He also ranks as number 14 in boxing history, also recognized by Ring Magazine, among boxers with most wins in a row, totalling 88 wins in a row.

Montanez began boxing in 1931, and captured the Puerto Rican lightweight title in 1933.  A European tour followed, and he registered victories in Spain, France, England, and Italy.  He was next showcased in New York, and scored wins over Aldo Spoldi and Frankie Klick among others.  That set up a non-title bout with lightweight king Lou Ambers, which Montanez won in a 10-round decision—he was thereafter dubbed the “uncrowned champion.” Impressive wins over formidable foes Eddie Ran, Wesley Ramey, and Freddie “Red” Cochrane set up a title bout with Ambers on the September 23, 1937, “Carnival of Champions” show at the Polo Grounds in New York City.  Although he was defeated for the first time (L 15), observers say he deserved the decision against Ambers.  Montanez bounced back to continue his winning ways in bouts with Jackie “Kid” Berg and Young Peter Jackson.

Montañez went for the world title two times, losing to  Lou Ambers on points. and then Henry Armstrong by a TKO in round 9.

Montañez reached great popularity in Puerto Rico, New York City, and Latin America, and his collection of photos with celebrities is considered one of the largest in Puerto Rico.  He had well over 250 pictures with celebrities such as Celia Cruz, Joe Louis, Jersey Joe Walcott, Cantinflas and some former Puerto Rico Governors and other famous people displayed on his house's walls.

Montañez was elected to the Salon de la Fama del Deporte Cayeyano in July 2004.

Montañez has a stadium named after him, the Pedro Montañez Municipal Stadium in Cayey.  It is the home of the Toritos de Cayey Double A baseball team, which was named after him, and it also was the Benigno Fernandez Garcia Jr. High School's field day competitions' site.

Hall of Fame
In December 2006, Montañez was elected to the International Boxing Hall of Fame and in 2007 he was inducted into the Boxing Hall of Fame located @ 360 N Peterboro St, Canastota, NY 13032

Professional boxing record

See also

List of Puerto Ricans
 Sports in Puerto Rico

References

External links
 International Boxing Hall of Fame page

1914 births
1996 deaths
International Boxing Hall of Fame inductees
People from Cayey, Puerto Rico
Puerto Rican male boxers
Lightweight boxers